Edmund Stafford may refer to:

 Edmund Stafford (1344–1419), bishop of Exeter
 Edmund Stafford, 1st Baron Stafford (1272–1308), British nobleman who was summoned to parliament by King Edward I
 Edmund Stafford, 5th Earl of Stafford (1377–1398), British nobleman

See also

 
 Stafford (surname)
 Stafford (disambiguation)